Cedar Pocket may refer to:
 Cedar Pocket Dam, a dam in the Wide Bay-Burnett area of Queensland, Australia
 Cedar Pocket, Queensland, a locality in the Gympie Region, Queensland, Australia